Hippeastrum calyptratum is a flowering perennial herbaceous bulbous plant, in the family Amaryllidaceae, native to Brazil.

Description 
This species has an approximately 7.5 cm wide, globose bulb, which is enclosed in persistent, brown leaf bases. The bulbs bear 5-6, approximately 45 - 60 cm long, 5 cm wide, light green leaves. The green flowers are produced in Autumn on 2-3 flowered umbels, which are supported by terete, green, about 60 cm long, and about 1.3 - 1.9 cm wide peduncles. Semi-discoid, flattened seeds are produced in globose-compressed capsule fruits.

Conservation 
This species is probably threatened by extinction, however not enough data is currently available on its distribution, and thus the proposed IUCN conservation Status is Data Deficient (DD).

Ecology 
The flowers are pollinated by bat species. It occurs in humid Atlantic Rainforest at elevations of 1200 m above sea level growing epiphytically on mossy trees or as a lithophyte on rocks.

Cytology 
The diploid chromosome count of this species is 2n = 22.

Physiology 
Several crinine-type alkaloids have been isolated from tissue of this species. The floral scent, which has been described as stale, sour, fermented, or similar to burnt plastic is composed of the following compounds: 1,8-cineole, perillene, camphor, linalool, limonene, g-terpinene, b-myrcene, sabinene, a-pinene, d-3-carene, and 3-hexanone.

Taxonomy 
This species was first described under the name Amaryllis calyptrata by John Bellenden Ker Gawler (Ker Gawl.) in 1817. Later it was transferred to the genus Hippeastrum under the name Hippeastrum calyptratum by William Herbert (Herb.) in 1821.

Etymology 
The specific epithet calyptratum is derived from the Latin calyptratum meaning "bearing a calyptra" or the Greek kalypto, kalyptra meaning "to hide" or "veil".

Cultivation 
The cultivation is thought to be difficult by some growers unfamiliar with the specific needs of epiphytes. In contrast to other members of the genus, the subtrate should be coarse, aerated, and well drained for this species.

References

Sources 
 
 GBIF:Hippeastrum calyptratum 

calyptratum
Endemic flora of Brazil
Flora of Brazil
Flora of the Atlantic Forest
Garden plants of South America
Plants described in 1821